Lightnin' Strikes (reissued as Nothin' But the Blues) is an album by blues musician Lightnin' Hopkins recorded in Los Angeles in 1965 and released on the Vee-Jay label.

Reception

Cub Koda, writing for AllMusic, described a later compilation featuring the entire album as an "interesting collection" and opined, "For a hodgepodge of leftovers, there's a lot of great Lightnin' on here."

Track listing
All compositions by Sam "Lightnin'" Hopkins
 "Mojo Hand" – 3:13
 "Little Wail" – 2:50
 "Cotton" – 5:57
 "Take Me Back" – 2:55
 "Nothin' But the Blues" – 5:15
 "Hurricane Betsy" – 5:45
 "Guitar Lightnin'" – 4:12
 "Woke Up This Morning" – 4:20
 "Shake Yourself" – 4:15

Personnel

Performance
Lightnin' Hopkins – electric guitar, vocals
Don Crawford – harmonica
Jimmy Bond – bass
Earl Palmer – drums

References

Lightnin' Hopkins albums
1966 albums
Verve Forecast Records albums